Main Jatti Punjab Di is a romantic Punjabi film released in 1964. The film was directed by Baldev S. Jhingan.

Plot
Preeto (Nishi) is a beautiful girl of a handicapped father, her mother is dead. She loves her father and takes responsibility of farming in their fields. She falls in love with a handsome boy, Prem (Premnath). Ramlal, the villain of the film, becomes rival of Prem and he also wants to marry Preeto. Ramlal complains to Prem's father about the love affair of Prem and Preeto. After a drama, Preeto's father considers it a matter of dishonour and gets angry with his daughter and dies after falling from the stairs. Prem's father (Jeevan) fixes Prem's marriage with a rich girl. Ramlal kidnaps Preeto and Prem mistakes his father as a kidnapper and after searching Preeto, he finds the truth. In the climax, Ramlal takes Prem and Preeto on target of gun, then Prem's father shoots Ramlal and agrees for the marriage of Prem and Preeto.

Songs
Lyrics by Verma Malik sang by
Asha Bhosle, Mahendra Kapoor, Shamshad Begum, Usha Mangeshkar, Suman Kalyanpur, S. Balbir.
"Main jatti Punjab di, meri..."
"Main sara Punjab gah laya..."
Parody song

References 

1964 films
Punjabi-language Indian films
1960s Punjabi-language films